Rich Man's Folly is a 1931 American pre-Code drama film directed by John Cromwell and written by Edward E. Paramore Jr. and Grover Jones. The film stars George Bancroft, Frances Dee, Robert Ames, Juliette Compton, David Durand, Dorothy Peterson, and Harry Allen. The film was released on November 14, 1931, by Paramount Pictures. This modern adaptation of the 1848 novel Dombey and Son is regarded as Hollywood's first major screen adaptation of a Charles Dickens work.

Plot

Cast
George Bancroft as Brock Trumbull
Frances Dee as Ann Trumbull
Robert Ames as Joe Warren
Juliette Compton as Paula Norcross
David Durand as Brock Junior
Dorothy Peterson as Katherine Trumbull
Harry Allen as McWylie
Gilbert Emery as Kincaid
Guy Oliver as Dayton
Anne Shirley as Anne, as a child 
George MacFarlane as Marston

Criticism
Director John Cromwell commented on the film and actor George Bancroft in an interview with historian Kinglesy Canham (circa 1975):

Preservation status
Although the film does still exist, Rich Man's Folly has not been seen publicly in decades. It has never been released onto VHS or DVD, and no re-showings or television broadcasts are known to have taken place. A surviving copy currently exists in the UCLA Film & Television Archive. Paramount created a promotional film in 1931 called The House That Shadows Built, with excerpts of Rich Man's Folly featured.

Footnotes

References
Canham, Kingsley. 1976. The Hollywood Professionals, Volume 5: King Vidor, John Cromwell, Mervyn LeRoy. The Tantivy Press, London.

External links

1931 films
American drama films
1931 drama films
Paramount Pictures films
Films directed by John Cromwell
American black-and-white films
1930s English-language films
1930s American films
Films scored by Bernhard Kaun
Films based on British novels
Films based on works by Charles Dickens
Films scored by John Leipold